Bengoi is a village on the northeastern coast of the Indonesian island of Seram. The Bengoi language is spoken by some 350 people in Bengoi and surrounding areas.

References

Populated places in Seram Island
East Seram Regency